The Magic Flute is Kenneth Branagh's English-language film version of Wolfgang Amadeus Mozart's singspiel Die Zauberflöte. The film is a co-production between France and the UK, produced by Idéale Audience and in association with UK's Peter Moores Foundation.

Interpretation
As part of the 250th anniversary celebration of Mozart's birthday, a new film version of The Magic Flute, set during World War I, was made, directed by Kenneth Branagh, with a translation by Stephen Fry. The film was presented at the Toronto International Film Festival on 7 September 2006, at the Venice Film Festival on 8 September of that year, and released in Switzerland on 5 April 2007.

The film, with a soundtrack performed by the Chamber Orchestra of Europe conducted by James Conlon, is the first motion picture version of the opera specifically intended for cinemas. Ingmar Bergman's 1975 film version was made for Swedish television and only later released to theatres. Branagh's version was shot in Super 35 and released in anamorphic widescreen, while Bergman's was filmed in Academy ratio for television sets of the 1970s. The story, which has been updated to a World War I setting, follows the structure of the original opera libretto. Tamino is sent by the Queen of the Night to rescue her daughter Pamina after Sarastro has apparently kidnapped her. His sidekick is Papageno, a man who uses underground pigeons to check for poison gas. Sarastro, in charge of a field hospital, is Pamina's father.

A DVD of the film was released in France in August 2007 with a bonus soundtrack CD (lasting around 79 minutes) and a "Making of" featurette (50 minutes). The film has also been released on DVD in the Netherlands (in a three-disc set), Finland, Argentina, and Japan.

Revolver Entertainment gave the film a theatrical release in the United States in June 2013, seven years after its premiere in Europe.

Casting
Branagh consulted with conductor James Conlon over casting choices. René Pape, who has sung and acted the role of Sarastro in several productions of the opera onstage, is the best-known singer in the entire film.

 Joseph Kaiser as Tamino
 Benjamin Jay Davis as Papageno
 Amy Carson as Pamina
 René Pape as Sarastro
 Lyubov Petrova as Queen of the Night
 Tom Randle as Monostatos
 Silvia Moi as Papagena
 Liz Smith as Old Papagena
 Teuta Koco, Louise Callinan, Kim-Marie Woodhouse as The Three Ladies
 William Dutton, Luke Lampard and Jamie Manton as The Three Boys

Release
The film was made on an estimated budget of $27 million. On 11 June 2013, seven years after its premiere, the film was finally released on a Region 1 DVD in the United States.

Critical reception
Varietys Derek Elley gave the film a mixed review. Total Film mistakenly blamed Mozart for the "silliness of the story".

In 2009, three years after the release of the film, Roger Lanser received a Cinematographer of the Year Award from the Australian Cinematographers Society for his work on The Magic Flute.

References

External links
 

2006 films
2000s musical fantasy films
Films with screenplays by Stephen Fry
British musical fantasy films
French musical fantasy films
English-language French films
Films directed by Kenneth Branagh
Films set in the 1910s
Films based on The Magic Flute
Opera films
2000s English-language films
2000s British films
2000s French films